Groot is a character appearing in American comic books published by Marvel Comics. Created by Stan Lee, Larry Lieber and Jack Kirby, the character first appeared in Tales to Astonish #13 (November 1960). An extraterrestrial, sentient tree-like creature, the original Groot first appeared as an invader that intended to capture humans for experimentation. The character can only say the repeated line "I am Groot", but has different meaning. In the Marvel Cinematic Universe, Star-Lord, Thor, and Rocket Raccoon are able to understand him.

The character was reintroduced as a heroic, noble being in 2006, and appeared in the crossover comic book storyline "Annihilation: Conquest." Groot went on to star in its spin-off series, Guardians of the Galaxy, joining the team of the same name.

Groot has been featured in a variety of associated Marvel merchandise, including animated television series, toys and trading cards. Vin Diesel voices Groot (with Krystian Godlewski playing the character via performance capture) in the Marvel Cinematic Universe (MCU) film Guardians of the Galaxy (2014) and cameoed as Groot's son (also named Groot) (with James Gunn playing the character via performance capture for dancing), colloquially known as "Baby Groot". Diesel reprised the role in the MCU films Guardians of the Galaxy Vol. 2 (2017), Avengers: Infinity War (2018), Avengers: Endgame (2019), Thor: Love and Thunder (2022) and The Guardians of the Galaxy Holiday Special. He portrayed Baby Groot in the short form series I Am Groot, and the upcoming Guardians of the Galaxy Vol. 3 (2023). Fred Tatasciore voices Groot on the Disney California Adventure ride Guardians of the Galaxy: Mission Breakout and Diesel voiced Groot as a cameo in the film Ralph Breaks the Internet (2018).

Publication history

Groot first appeared in Tales to Astonish #13 (Nov. 1960), and was created by Stan Lee, Larry Lieber and Jack Kirby. He appeared again in The Incredible Hulk vol. 2 Annual #5 (Oct. 1976), alongside five other monsters from Marvel's anthology horror comics of the late 1950s and early 1960s. In The Sensational Spider-Man #−1 (July 1997), Groot was featured in a nightmare of the young Peter Parker.

Groot reappeared in 2006 in the six-issue limited series Nick Fury's Howling Commandos, and appeared in the Annihilation: Conquest and Annihilation: Conquest – Star-Lord limited series. Groot went on to join the Guardians of the Galaxy in the series of the same name and remained a fixture of the title until its cancellation with issue #25 in 2010. Groot appeared in its follow-up, the limited series The Thanos Imperative, and, alongside fellow Guardian Rocket Raccoon, Groot starred in backup features in Annihilators #1–4 (March–June 2011) and Annihilators: Earthfall #1–4 (Sept.–Dec. 2011).

Groot appeared in issues #6–8 of Avengers Assemble as a member of the Guardians. Groot is one of the stars of Guardians of the Galaxy vol. 3, a part of the Marvel NOW! relaunch.

In March 2015, it was announced that Groot would be getting his very first solo series by writer Jeff Loveness and artist Brian Kesinger.

The Groot that debuted in Tales to Astonish and the one that was introduced in Annihilation: Conquest were retroactively established as being separate members of the same species in the sixth and final issue of the Groot ongoing series that launched in June 2015. With Infinity Wars in August 2018, however, Groot specifically references the fact that during his first visit to the planet Earth, he had promised to "march across the surface of the planet and doom all who dared to oppose Groot." This seemingly reverted the character's origins to having both eras of Groot referencing the same persona, therefore invalidating the retroactive change from issue six of the Groot series.

Origins
Groot is a Flora colossus from Planet X, the capital of the branch worlds. The Flora colossi are tree-like beings whose language is almost impossible to understand due to the stiffness of their larynxes, causing their speech to sound like they are repeating the phrase "I am Groot". Other beings try to be friendly but become angry with the Flora colossi for their apparent inability to speak, though Groot was shown to have been actually speaking not just understandably but eloquently in his language throughout Annihilation: Conquest. The Flora colossi are ruled over by the "Arbor Masters" and teach the children of the species with "Photonic Knowledge", which is the collected knowledge of the Arbor Masters of the generations and is absorbed through photosynthesis; this is a highly advanced education method, making the Flora colossi geniuses.

The Flora colossus sapling that would come to be known as "Groot" came from an "Ennobled Sap-line" and was gifted with a tremendous grasp of quasi-dimensional super-positional engineering. Groot did not get along with fellow saplings but instead preferred the company of the "Maintenance Mammals", against which the other saplings discriminated. Groot was exiled by the "Arbor Masters" in Guardians of the Galaxy #14 after killing another sapling to defend a maintenance mammal it was brutalizing.

An alternate origin was presented in the Groot ongoing series. In the story, it is revealed that the other Flora colossi had been abducting organisms from other planets, including a young human girl named Hannah. After seeing Hannah, Groot realized that what his people were doing was wrong and managed to save the child and send her back to Earth. However, for his disobedience, Groot was exiled from Planet X and forced to wander the universe until he met Rocket Raccoon many decades later, where this version of Groot later became a member of the Guardians of the Galaxy.

Fictional character biography
Original Groot
Groot is an extraterrestrial tree monster who initially came to Earth seeking humans to capture and study. Groot was seemingly destroyed by termites used by Leslie Evans.

Xemnu made a duplicate of Groot by making a human and tree hybrid that was used to fight the Hulk, but it was destroyed in the battle.

Groot was later revealed to have survived, but was a captive of the Collector and held in his zoo in Canada until Groot and the other captive creatures were freed by the Mole Man. Groot and the other creatures rampaged in New York City until they were stopped by a band of superheroes, and were then dumped through a portal to the Negative Zone.

Groot was later tracked down and captured by S.H.I.E.L.D.'s Paranormal Containment Unit, nicknamed the Howling Commandos, when his tree scent was detected by Sasquatch and Abominable Snowman. While Groot was being held captive, Gorilla-Man talked to Groot about joining the Howling Commandos. When Merlin and his forces attacked the base, the Howling Commandos let Groot and their other captives free, who proceeded to stampede on Merlin's army; Groot was the only one to turn back, offering to join the Howling Commandos. Groot aided the Howling Commandos as they assaulted Merlin's forces.

Guardians of the Galaxy's Groot

A different Groot played a part in Annihilation: Conquest, at which time it was shown Groot may be the last remaining member of the Flora colossi and was under arrest by the Kree for an unknown reason. Groot earned freedom by joining Star-Lord's strike force, where Groot and Rocket Raccoon formed a bond, Rocket being one of the few beings with the ability to understand Groot's language. Star-Lord's team fought their way through the Phalanx, but after the death of Deathcry the team decided to escape through a drainage pipe that Groot could not fit into.

As a consequence of the battle, Groot dies, buying the team some time to escape. A new Groot was created as a sprig offshoot and went on to accompany the team on their continued mission against the Phalanx, but was one of the team members captured by the Phalanx. Groot and the others were freed by Mantis, and escaped back to the lines of the Kree's resistance. In time, Groot's body regenerated from the twig, growing back to full size. Groot and the others intended to carry on as part of Star-Lord's team.

Groot and the team returned to Hala to prepare another assault against the Phalanx, but their agent Blastaar was captured by the Phalanx and taken to their Babel Spire as he tried to carry Groot's pollen spores. Groot and Rocket Raccoon continued their mission by sneaking into the sub-basement of the Babel Spire. When Star-Lord was captured by Ultron, the original  plan of laying explosives in the Spire failed, so Rocket Raccoon and Groot needed to come up with a new plan. Groot decided to sprout inside the Spire, growing to colossal size and filling a large portion of the building.

Mantis was able to remix Groot's sap in a way as to make it extremely flammable, and again Groot died for the team, this time by purposefully igniting so the resulting fire would destroy the Babel Spire. A cutting of Groot was kept by Rocket Raccoon, though, and Groot was again able to regrow. Groot then joined the new Guardians of the Galaxy (or, as Groot would have it, "Groot and Branches"), and began regrowing under the care of Mantis.

When the Guardians reformed, Groot joined with Star-Lord, Rocket Raccoon, Drax the Destroyer and Gamora, whom Groot counted as friends.

During the 2015 Secret Wars storyline, Groot is with the Guardians of the Galaxy when they take part in the incursion between Earth-616 and Earth-1610. Groot and Rocket Raccoon are killed by the Children of Tomorrow. However, when Peter Quill — one of the few survivors of the incursions from Earth-616 — finds himself confronted by Black Swan in the castle of Emperor Doom, he reveals that he has been carrying a small twig of Groot in his pocket ever since the incursion, slamming it into the roots of the World Tree and causing Groot to transform the giant tree into his body, decimating Doom's castle as the surviving heroes mount their final assault.

During the "Civil War II" storyline, Groot and the Guardians of the Galaxy are summoned by Captain Marvel to help her in her fight against Iron Man's side when it came to the fate of the Inhuman Ulysses Cain. The resulting battle damaged the Guardians of the Galaxy's ship stranding them on Earth.

During the "Monsters Unleashed" storyline, the Guardians of the Galaxy defend Groot from a snake-headed Leviathon.

During the "Secret Empire" storyline, Groot and the rest of the Guardians of the Galaxy assist Captain Marvel, the Alpha Flight Space Program, members of the Ultimates, Hyperion, and Quasar in intercepting a fleet of Chitauri that are approaching Earth until a Hydra-aligned Steve Rogers activated the Planetary Defense Shield trapping those fighting the Chitauri outside of Earth's atmosphere. Star-Lord, Rocket Raccoon, and Groot try to enlist representatives of the Skrulls, Kree, Brood, Shi'ar and Spartax empires that are on the Galactic Council in helping against the Chitauri hordes and to break down the Planetary Defense Shield and get rid of Hydra. Realizing they are now facing a galaxy without human interference, the Galactic Council refuses aid and attempt to kill the three Guardians as they flee. After the Planetary Defense Shield is shut down, Groot and the Guardians of the Galaxy join the final battle against Hydra.

Rocket Raccoon and Groot are on their way to the Stohlad Ring when they are ambushed by Gardener where he shattered Groot because the Guardians of the Galaxy "corrupted" him and diverted him from his true purpose. Rocket Raccoon escaped with a splinter where Groot grew a new body from it.

During the "Infinity Countdown" storyline, Groot was with the Guardians of the Galaxy when they notice that the planet Telferina is under attack by the Flora colossi that Gardener grew from Groot's splinters. Groot got close to Gardener and used his healing powers to purge the poison that Loki put in him from his body. Gardener repaid Groot by using his abilities to restore Groot back to his previous size. In addition, Groot can now speak in full sentences and refers to himself in the third person.

 Characterization 

 Powers and abilities 
Groot can absorb wood as food, and has the ability to regenerate. Groot can control trees and plants, using them to attack others, and appears to be resistant to fire. Groot is able to sprout dramatically increasing mass which then severely inhibits movement.

Groot has been seemingly killed on multiple occasions, each time regrowing from a sprig.

 "I am Groot" 
Black Bolt's brother Maximus the Mad asserted that whenever Groot is saying the trademark "I am Groot!" he has actually been saying a number of things, and his varying inflections of the sentence are the equivalent of words and sentences. People who have interacted with Groot are gradually able to decipher the meaning of the inflections and can carry on full conversations with Groot as time goes on. The mature form of Groot's species is robust and heavyweight, which causes the organs of acoustic generation to become stiff and inflexible. It is this nature of Groot's larynx that causes people, who are oblivious to the subtle nuances of Flora colossi speech, to misinterpret Groot as merely repeating his name. It could not be determined whether Maximus's claim was true or merely another manifestation of his madness, though Groot did genuinely seem to be assisting Maximus with highly advanced engineering. Later, in All-New X-Men #23, Jean Grey telepathically links with Groot, showing that Groot's thought processes are indeed complex, and the declaration of "I am Groot!" usually represents attempts at highly intelligent communication. 

In Avengers: Infinity War, which takes place in the Marvel Cinematic Universe, Thor explains that Flora colossi is offered as an elective in Asgardian schools. Filmmaker James Gunn has interpreted this as a joke on the part of the character of Thor.

 Cultural impact and legacy 

 Accolades 

 In 2015, Den of Geek ranked Groot 16th in their "Marvel’s 31 Best Monsters" list.
 In 2018, CBR.com ranked Groot 7th in their "25 Most Powerful Guardians Of The Galaxy" list.
 In 2018, Vanity Fair included Groot in their "Stan Lee’s Most Iconic Characters" list.
 In 2021, Screen Rant ranked Groot 12th in their "20 Most Powerful Guardians Of The Galaxy Members In The Comics" list.
 In 2022, The A.V Club ranked Groot 37th in their "100 best Marvel characters" list.
 In 2022, CBR.com ranked Groot 2nd in their "10 Cutest Marvel Heroes" list.

 Impact 
Mike Fenn of The Daily Dot asserted, "The success of the Marvel Cinematic Universe’s latest entry, Guardians of the Galaxy, has resulted in the spread of the Internet’s latest meme: I Am Groot." C. M Crockford of Looper wrote, "Groot quickly became an Internet meme thanks to his simple vocabulary and pleasant nature, with his catchphrase "I am Groot" spreading into popular culture."

 Literary reception 

 Volumes 

 Groot - 2015 
According to Diamond Comic Distributors, Groot #1 was the 10th best selling comic book in June 2015.

 Rocket Raccoon and Groot - 2016 
According to Diamond Comic Distributors, Rocket Raccoon and Groot #1 was the 15th best-selling comic book in January 2016.

Jesse Schedeen of IGN gave Rocket Raccoon and Groot #1 a grade of 7.8 out of 10, writing, "This new series may not feel terribly "all-new" or "all-different," but it features a proven creative team exploring the continued misadventures of Rocket and Groot. It's tough to go wrong with that. Unlike some Guardians comics, this series quickly finds its niche and promises interesting wrinkles to come for both characters."

 I Am Groot - 2017 
According to Diamond Comic Distributors, I Am Groot #1was the 71st best-selling comic book in May 2017.

Alexander Jones of Comics Beat called I Am Groot #1 a "charming, colorful tale," saying, "Thankfully, I Am Groot is the beginning of something good. All the pieces are there story-wise, art-wise, and character-wise. Now the task is the new journey we’re taking with some ink and paper friends. Fans of the movies and fans of the original comics will find much to appreciate with this issue. Time to blast up the jams on your old cassette tape deck and enjoy with a smile." Baltimore Lauren of Bleeding Cool asserted, "Hastings delivers a strong narrative with the small tree creature-slash-assassin. Despite only speaking three words, he does inflect great emotion through Groot. Flaviano's art adds to it, as Groot is given a visible range of emotion to help the reader understand what he's saying. His overtly cartoony Groot stands out wonderfully well against the much more realistic Guardians (even Rocket), drawing the reader's eye to Groot in every panel he's in. This is a great trick, as it does show that Groot is the central focus. At the climax of the book, the art gets downright weird, but it's beautiful. The planet Terminal is presented as an eerie alternate world, with vibrant colors (thanks to Menyz). The colors are stunning throughout the whole book — he uses them well to set up the overall feel of each page. I honestly can't pick a favorite panel, since this whole book is beautiful to look at."

In other media
Television
 Groot appears in The Avengers: Earth's Mightiest Heroes episode "Michael Korvac", voiced by Troy Baker.
 Groot appears in Ultimate Spider-Man, originally voiced by Michael Clarke Duncan (in "Guardians of the Galaxy"), and by Kevin Michael Richardson in subsequent episodes.
 Additionally, an alternate reality version of Groot appears in "Return to the Spider-Verse" Pt. 2 as Captain Web Beard's sentient pirate ship, the Groot.
 Groot appears in Avengers Assemble, voiced by Kevin Michael Richardson.
 Groot appears in Hulk and the Agents of S.M.A.S.H., voiced again by Kevin Michael Richardson.
 Groot appears in Marvel Disk Wars: The Avengers, voiced by Masato Funaki in Japanese and John Eric Bentley in English.
 Groot appears in Guardians of the Galaxy, voiced again by Kevin Michael Richardson. This version's home planet was invaded by Ronan the Accuser, which left Groot the last of his kind. In the present, Star-Lord has a vision of the Flora colossi, which eventually leads to the race's revival.
 Groot appears in Marvel Super Hero Adventures: Frost Fight!, voiced again by Kevin Michael Richardson.
 Groot appears in Rocket & Groot, voiced again by Kevin Michael Richardson.
 Groot appears in Lego Marvel Super Heroes - Guardians of the Galaxy: The Thanos Threat, with Kevin Michael Richardson reprising his role from various Marvel media.
 Groot appears in Spider-Man, with his child form voiced by Connor Andrade. In the episode "Amazing Friends", Star-Lord sends him to Earth to warn Earth's heroes of a Klyntar invasion. In the episode "Vengeance of Venom", Groot becomes possessed by one of the Klyntar, but Max Modell captures and frees him to combine his pollination abilities with the Anti-Venom symbiote to cure the Klyntar's victims and fend off the invasion.

Marvel Cinematic Universe

Groot and his son Groot II appear in media set in the Marvel Cinematic Universe (MCU), both voiced by Vin Diesel, who also provided voice work for a number of languages the movie was released in and some motion capture elements for the characters.

Film
 Vin Diesel voices Baby Groot in Ralph Breaks the Internet.

Video games
 Groot appears as a playable character in Marvel Avengers Alliance.
 Groot appears as an assist character for Rocket Raccoon and "team-up hero" in Marvel Heroes.
 Two incarnations of Groot and Rocket Raccoon appear as a hybrid playable character in Marvel Puzzle Quest.
 Groot appears as a playable character in Lego Marvel Super Heroes, with Troy Baker reprising his role from The Avengers: Earth's Mightiest Heroes.
 Groot appears as a playable character in Disney Infinity 2.0, voiced again by Kevin Michael Richardson.
 An alternate universe version of Groot known as King Groot' appears as a playable character in Marvel Contest of Champions.
 Groot appears as a playable character in Marvel: Future Fight.
 Groot appears as a playable character in Disney Infinity 3.0, voiced again by Kevin Michael Richardson.
 Groot appears in Guardians of the Galaxy: The Telltale Series, voiced by Adam Harrington.
 Groot appears as a playable character in Lego Marvel Super Heroes 2, voiced by Stefan Ashton Frank. Additionally, Small Groot (based on Baby Groot from Guardians of the Galaxy Vol. 2) and Small Groot with a Ravager uniform appear as different variations.
 Groot appears as an assist character for Rocket Raccoon in Marvel vs. Capcom: Infinite, voiced again by Kevin Michael Richardson.
 Groot appears as a playable character in Marvel Strike Force.
 Groot and Rocket Raccoon appear as a hybrid playable character in Marvel Ultimate Alliance 3: The Black Order, with the former voiced again by Adam Harrington.
 Groot serves as inspiration for an outfit and "backbling" in Fortnite Battle Royale.
 Groot appears in Marvel's Guardians of the Galaxy, voiced by Robert Montcalm.
 Groot appears in the digital collectible card game Marvel Snap.

Toys
 A Groot action figure was released in the Marvel Universe toyline as part of a Guardians of the Galaxy pack.
 A Rocket Raccoon and Groot figure set with a "Dancing Baby Groot" will be released by Hot Toys.
 Funko announced a "Dancing Groot Funko POP" vinyl figure on August 26, 2014 and released it shortly after Christmas 2014.
 Groot received multiple figures in HeroClix.

Theme parks
 The adult MCU incarnation of Groot appears as a meet and greet character at Disney California Adventure as part of Guardians of the Galaxy - Mission: Breakout!.
 Baby Groot appears in the aforementioned Guardians of the Galaxy - Mission: Breakout!'', voiced by Fred Tatasciore.

Telecommunications 
 In 2014, Twilio employee Ricky Robinett set up a phone number at which Groot can be texted, (866) 740–4531, which results in the character's familiar response "I am Groot".

Collected editions

See also
 List of Marvel Comics superhero debuts

References

External links
 
 
 

Characters created by Jack Kirby
Characters created by Stan Lee
Characters created by Larry Lieber
Comics characters introduced in 1960
Fictional characters with plant abilities
Fictional characters with superhuman durability or invulnerability
Fictional characters who can stretch themselves
Fictional trees
Guardians of the Galaxy characters
Male characters in film
Marvel Comics aliens
Marvel Comics characters with accelerated healing
Marvel Comics characters with superhuman strength
Marvel Comics extraterrestrial superheroes
Marvel Comics male superheroes
Marvel Comics plant characters